Mellow Yellow was the oldest cannabis coffeeshop in Amsterdam. It was squatted in 1972 then moved to a new building in 1978. It was forced to close at the start of 2017.

History
The cannabis coffeeshop was founded in 1972 by the hippie Wernard Bruining and friends in a squatted former bakery on Weesperzijde, Amsterdam. He called it a teahouse, inspired by 1920s and 1930s cannabis cafes in the USA. The shop was named after "Mellow Yellow", a song by Donovan which describes the singer trying to become intoxicated through smoking the peel of banana. It was the first such shop in the world. The intent of the shop was to sell cannabis, despite it being illegal to do so. Other early coffeeshops included Rusland and The Bulldog.

Closure
The shop was closed at the beginning of 2017, under new legislation requiring 28 coffeeshops in Amsterdam located within 250 meters of schools to close. The owner Johnny Petram protested that the school near to his shop was a hairstyling academy with students generally over the age of 18, but the Amsterdam government still required its closure, in part to protect the remaining coffeeshops in Amsterdam from the  requirements used in other parts of the Netherlands which bans foreigners from coffeeshops. Petram stated his hope that he would be able to reopen Mellow Yellow at a new location.

Citations

References

External links
 Mellow Yellow Lounge
 Stichting Mediwiet

Cannabis coffeeshops
Cannabis in the Netherlands
Retail companies of the Netherlands
1972 in cannabis
Retail companies established in 1972
Retail companies disestablished in 2017
2017 in cannabis
Defunct companies of the Netherlands
Dutch companies established in 1972
Dutch companies disestablished in 2017
Coffeehouses and cafés in the Netherlands
Restaurants in the Netherlands
Squats in the Netherlands
20th-century architecture in the Netherlands